This is a complete listing of National Hockey League (NHL) playoff series, grouped by franchise. Series featuring relocated teams are kept with their ultimate relocation franchises. Bolded years indicate wins. Years in italics indicate series in progress. Tables are sorted first by the number of series, then the number of wins, and then alphabetically.

Anaheim Ducks

Arizona Coyotes

Boston Bruins

Buffalo Sabres

Calgary Flames

Carolina Hurricanes

Chicago Blackhawks

Colorado Avalanche

Columbus Blue Jackets

Dallas Stars

Detroit Red Wings

Edmonton Oilers

Florida Panthers

Los Angeles Kings

Minnesota Wild

Montreal Canadiens

Nashville Predators

New Jersey Devils

New York Islanders

New York Rangers

Ottawa Senators

Philadelphia Flyers

Pittsburgh Penguins

St. Louis Blues

San Jose Sharks

Tampa Bay Lightning

Toronto Maple Leafs

Vancouver Canucks

Vegas Golden Knights

Washington Capitals

Winnipeg Jets

Defunct teams

California Golden Seals

Montreal Maroons

New York Americans

Ottawa Senators (original)

Pittsburgh Pirates

Most frequent NHL playoff series
This is a list of the most frequent NHL playoff series.

References

Notes

See also
List of NBA playoff series
List of WNBA playoff series
List of NFL playoff games
List of MLB postseason series

playoffs